Lawrence Daniel Huculak  (born January 25, 1951, in Vernon, British Columbia) is the Metropolitan of the Ukrainian Catholic Archeparchy of Winnipeg, Canada. In 1969 he entered the Order of St. Basil the Great in Mundare, Alberta.

He was ordained a priest on August 28, 1977, and was ordained as the Eparchial Bishop of Edmonton on 3 April 1997.

He was appointed Metropolitan of Winnipeg on 9 January 2006 and installed on 11 February 2006. He holds a doctorate in eastern liturgy from the Pontifical Oriental Institute in Rome.

In 2022 he will have been a priest for 45 years, and 25 years as a bishop. In 2009 he became the second longest-serving metropolitan archbishop of Winnipeg, after Metropolitan Maxim Hermaniuk, who served for 36 years.

On April 28, 2022, he was named Apostolic Administrator of the Eparchy of Saskatoon.

References

Catholic Hierarchy Entry
Biography

External links
http://archeparchy.ca/page.php?id=1

1951 births
Canadian people of Ukrainian descent
People from Vernon, British Columbia
Bishops of the Ukrainian Greek Catholic Church in Canada
Canadian members of the Ukrainian Greek Catholic Church
Living people
Eastern Catholic archeparchs in North America
Pontifical Oriental Institute alumni
Archbishops of the Ukrainian Greek Catholic Church